North Thanet is a constituency in Kent represented in the House of Commons of the UK Parliament since its 1983 creation by Sir Roger Gale, a Conservative.

History
North Thanet and South Thanet were created by a rearrangement of the former Thanet West and Thanet East constituencies in 1983, which in turn had been created in 1974 by the splitting of the single Isle of Thanet seat.  Apart from 1997, when it was marginal, the seat has to date been a safe seat for the Conservative Party.

The third-placed opponent in the 1983 election, for Labour, was Cherie Blair whose husband Tony Blair, was Prime Minister between 1997 and 2007. He entered Parliament that same year, representing Sedgefield: the couple are said to have had a pact that whichever one of them became an MP first would be the one to pursue that career, and not the other. Cherie thus continued with her legal career whilst Tony was an MP.

Constituency profile
Tourism forms an important economic activity with sandy beaches, particularly at Margate: among the main attractions, the seat has a small amount of fishing relative to the 19th century or major ports of North East and Scotland. It also has a slightly higher proportion of retired people than the national average and incomes tending to be clustered towards the national mean. Economic developments have included the Thanet Offshore Wind Project, as well as commercial, recreational and tourism activities. Manston Airport is now closed but is subject to competing development plans, including reopening the airport for freight terminal or alternatively as a mixed development business park. In unemployment terms the claimant count was third highest of the South East's 84 constituencies at the end of 2010.

Boundaries

1983–2010: The District of Thanet wards of Birchington East, Birchington West, Cecil, Cliftonville, Dane Park, Ethelbert, Margate West, Marine, Northdown Park, Pier, Salmestone, Thanet Parishes, and Westgate-on-Sea, and the City of Canterbury wards of Herne, Heron, Reculver, and West Bay.

2010–present: The District of Thanet wards of Birchington North, Birchington South, Dane Valley, Garlinge, Margate Central, Salmestone, Thanet Villages, Westbrook, and Westgate-on-Sea, and the City of Canterbury wards of Greenhill and Eddington, Herne and Broomfield, Heron, Marshside, Reculver, and West Bay.

North Thanet consists of the northern and western parts of Thanet district (most of Margate, apart from the Cliftonville area), Westgate-on-Sea, Birchington-on-Sea, and several villages including Acol, St Nicholas-at-Wade, Minster, Manston, Monkton and Sarre) as well as the town of Herne Bay in the City of Canterbury district.

Members of Parliament

Elections

Elections in the 2010s

Elections in the 2000s

Elections in the 1990s

Elections in the 1980s

See also
List of parliamentary constituencies in Kent

Notes

References

Parliamentary constituencies in Kent
Thanet
 
Constituencies of the Parliament of the United Kingdom established in 1983